

te

tea-tee
Teargen
Tearisol
Tebamide
tebanicline tosylate (USAN)
tebatizole (INN)
tebipenem (INN)
Tebrazid
tebufelone (INN)
tebuquine (INN)
tecadenoson (USAN)
tecalcet (USAN)
tecarfarin (USAN)
tecastemizole (USAN)
teceleukin (INN)
Technecoll 
Technelite 
Technescan 
technetium (99mTc) apcitide (INN)
technetium (99mTc) bicisate (INN)
technetium (99mTc) disofenin
technetium (99mTc) exametazime
Technetium (99mTc) fanolesomab (USAN)
technetium (99mTc) furifosmin (INN)
technetium (99mTc) glucoheptonate
technetium (99mTc) labeled RBC
technetium (99mTc) labeled WBC
technetium (99mTc) macro aggregated albumin
technetium (99mTc) mebrofenin
technetium (99mTc) mertiatide
technetium (99mTc) nitridocade (USAN)
Technetium (99mTc) nofetumomab merpentan (INN)
technetium (99mTc) pentetate
technetium (99mTc) pertechnetate
technetium (99mTc) pintumomab (INN)
technetium (99mTc) sestamibi (INN)
technetium (99mTc) siboroxime (INN)
technetium (99mTc) sulesomab (INN)
technetium (99mTc) sulfur colloid
technetium (99mTc) teboroxime (INN)
technetium (99mTc) tilmanocept (USAN)
Technetium (99mTc) votumumab (INN)
teclothiazide (INN)
teclozan (INN)
tecovirimat (USAN, (INN)
Teczem 
tedalinab (INN)
tedatioxetine (USAN)
tedisamil (INN)
tedizolid (USAN)
Tedral
teduglutide (USAN)
Teebacin

tef-tel
tefazoline (INN)
tefenperate (INN)
tefibazumab (USAN)
tefinostat (INN)
tefludazine (INN)
teflurane (INN)
teflutixol (INN)
Tega-Vert
tegafur (INN)
tegaserod (USAN)
Tegison 
teglarinad (USAN, INN)
tegobuvir (USAN, INN)
Tegopen 
Tegretol (Novartis)
Tegrin
teicoplanin (INN)
telaprevir (USAN)
telapristone (USAN, INN)
telatinib (USAN)
telavancin (USAN)
telbermin (INN)
telbivudine (USAN)
telcagepant (USAN, INN)
Teldrin (Gemini Pharmaceuticals)
telenzepine (INN)
Telepaque (Sterling-Winthrop)
telimomab aritox (INN)
telinavir (INN)
Teline
telithromycin (USAN)
telmesteine (INN)
telmisartan (INN)
telotristat (USAN, INN)
teloxantrone (INN)
teludipine (INN)

tem
temafloxacin (INN)
temanogrel (USAN, INN)
Temaril 
temarotene (INN)
tematropium metilsulfate (INN)
Temaz 
temazepam (INN)
temefos (INN)
temelastine (INN)
temiverine (INN)
temocapril (INN)
temocaprilat (INN)
temocillin (INN)
Temodar 
Temodar (Schering) 
temodox (INN)
temoporfin (INN)
Temovate 
temozolomide (INN)
Tempra
temsirolimus (USAN)
temurtide (INN)

ten-teo
Ten-K 
Tenake
tenamfetamine (INN)
Tenathan 
tenatumomab (USAN)
Tencon 
tendamistat (INN)
tenecteplase (INN)
tenegliptin (USAN)
teneliximab (USAN)
Tenex 
tenidap (INN)
tenifatecan (USAN, INN)
tenilapine (INN)
teniloxazine (INN)
tenilsetam (INN)
teniposide (INN)
tenivastatin calcium (USAN)
tenocyclidine (INN)
tenonitrozole (INN)
Tenoretic 
Tenormin 
tenosal (INN)
tenosiprol (INN)
tenoxicam (INN)
Tensilon 
Tenuate 
tenylidone (INN)
teopranitol (INN)
teoprolol (INN)

tep-teq
Tepanil 
tepirindole (INN)
teplizumab (USAN)
tepoxalin (INN)
teprenone (INN)
teprotide (INN)
teprotumumab (INN, USAN)
Tequin (Bristol-Myers Squibb)

ter

tera-terg
terameprocol (USAN)
Terazol 
terazosin (INN)
terbequinil (INN)
terbinafine (INN)
terbogrel (INN)
terbucromil (INN)
terbufibrol (INN)
terbuficin (INN)
terbuprol (INN)
terbutaline (INN)
terciprazine (INN)
terconazole (INN)
terdecamycin (INN)
tererstigmine (INN)
terfenadine (INN)
terflavoxate (INN)
terfluranol (INN)
Terfonyl 
terguride (INN)

teri-teru
teriflunomide (USAN)
terikalant (INN)
Teril 
teriparatide (INN)
terizidone (INN)
terlakiren (INN)
terlipressin (INN)
ternidazole (INN)
terodiline (INN)
terofenamate (INN)
teroxalene (INN)
teroxirone (INN)
Terra-Cortril 
Terramycin 
tertatolol (INN)
tertomotide (USAN)
terutroban (INN)

tes
tesaglitazar (USAN)
tesamorelin (USAN)
teserstigmine (INN)
tesetaxel (INN)
tesicam (INN)
tesimide (INN)
Teslac 
Teslac (Bristol-Myers Squibb) 
Teslascan 
Tessalon 
Testim 
Testoderm 
testolactone (INN)
Testomar
Testopel
testosterone ketolaurate (INN)
testosterone undecanoate (USAN)
testosterone (INN)
Testred 
Tesuloid

tet
tetrabarbital (INN)
tetrabenazine (INN)
tetracaine (INN)
Tetracap
Tetrachel 
tetracosactide (INN)
tetracycline (INN)
Tetracyn 
tetradonium bromide (INN)
Tetralan
Tetram
Tetramed 
tetramethrin (INN)
tetramisole (INN)
Tetramune
tetraxetan (USAN)
tetrazepam (INN)
tetrazolast (INN)
Tetrex 
tetridamine (INN)
tetriprofen (INN)
tetrofosmin (INN)
tetronasin (INN)
tetroquinone (INN)
tetroxoprim (INN)
tetrylammonium bromide (INN)
tetryzoline (INN)

tev-tez
Tev-Tropin 
teverelix (INN)
Teveten 
Texacort 
texacromil (INN)
tezampanel (USAN)

See also
 List of radiopharmaceuticals

References